Prasina  may refer to:
 Prasina Poulia, one of the oldest football club in Kalamata, Greece
 Crvena prašina (Red Dust), a 1999 Croatian film directed by Zrinko Ogresta
 Dust (2001 film) (Prašina), a 2001 Macedonian film

Taxonomy
 a synonym for Julia, a gastropod genus